Tension Filter (or stylized as >Tension Filter<) is the debut studio album by haloblack, released on November 1, 1994 by Fifth Colvmn Records.

Reception 

John Bush of AllMusic says "the group breathes life into somewhat tired industrial-rock, even though the requisite metal guitars, distortion and drum programming are nothing new." Last Sigh Magazine recommended the album for fans of Nine Inch Nails 1989 album Pretty Hate Machine and described it as "a great mix of synth and guitar work and is chockfull of electronic sound -- perfect for the industrial/electronic scene." Sonic Boom agreed with the comparison for the "sheer depth, power, and stark originality" of the compositions and said "Bryan manages to bring a guitar into his music with a depth and a sound that only people like Trent Renzor can dream of."

Track listing

Personnel 
Adapted from the Tension Filter liner notes.

haloblack
 Bryan Barton (as Bryan Black) – vocals, instruments, editing, production
 Bill Morrisette – production, guitar (1, 2, 3, 5, 8, 9)
 Damien Ray – instruments, production, additional programming (7)

Additional performers
 Malik – guitar (10)
 Krayge Tyler – guitar (4, 6, 7, 10)
 Jim Marcus – additional vocals (4)

Production and design
 Tom Baker – mastering
 Van Christie – production and engineering (4, 5, 6, 10)
 Steve "Mud" Krayson – editing
 Mary Lawing – cover art
 Jim Marcus – production
 Jason McNinch – engineering (4, 5, 6, 10)
 Jordan Nogood – design
 Sabrina A. Rahaman – photography
 Chis Satenger – editing
 Carl White – production, engineering and mixing (1, 2, 3, 7, 8, 9)

Release history

References

External links 
 
 Tension Filter at Bandcamp
 Tension Filter at Discogs (list of releases)

1994 debut albums
Haloblack albums
Fifth Colvmn Records albums